Acıbadem is an underground station on the M4 line of the Istanbul Metro in the Acıbadem neighborhood of Kadıköy, Istanbul. Situated under the D.100 state highway, near Acıbadem Avenue. The station was opened on 17 August 2012 along with the Kadıköy-Kartal portion of the M4 line.

Station Layout

Connections
Connections to IETT Bus service are available via the Acıbadem Metro İst. bus stop. The following routes stop here:

3A — Kadıköy - Ünalan Mahallesi
11T — Türkiş Blokları - Üsküdar
13M — Üsküdar - Şerifali
13Y — Kadıköy - Çakmak Mahallesi/Yenisahra
14A — Kadıköy - Alemdağ
14BK — Kadıköy - Parseller Mahallesi
14DK — Kadıköy/Libadiye Caddesi - İnkılap Mahallesi
15BK — Kadıköy - Dereski/Beykoz
16A — Üküdar - Pendik
16B — Kadıköy - Kartal Metro/Topselvi
16C — Kadıköy - Hilal Konutları
16F — Üsküdar - Fındıklı Mahallesi
16KH — Kadıköy - Yenişehir/Marmara Üniv. Hastanesi
16M — Üsküdar - Ataşehir
16U — Üsküdar - Uğur Mumcu
16Y — Kadıköy - Yeşilbağlar
16Z — Kadıköy - Çamlık/Kartal Cezaevi
17K — Kadıköy - Kavakpınar
18E — Kadıköy - Yenidoğan/Samandıra
18K — Kadıköy - Sultanbeyli Gölet
18Ü — Üsküdar - Sultanbeyli
18V — Kadıköy - Veysel Karani/Samandıra
18Y — Üsküdar - Yenidoğan/Samandıra
19 — Kadıköy - Ferhatpaşa/Yeditepe Üniversitesi
19A — Ayrılıkçeşme - Yenidoğan
19B — Kadıköy - Başbüyük Mahallesi
19E — Kadıköy - Yenidoğan
19FK — Ayrılıkçeşme - Fındıklı Mahallesi
19H — Kadıköy - Marmara Eğtim Köyü
19T — Kadıköy - Ferhatpaşa
19Z — Kadıköy - Zümrütevler
20E — Kadıköy - Esatpaşa
20Ü — Kadıköy - Ümraniye Tepeüstü
21B — Kadıköy - Küçükbakkalköy
21C — Kadıköy - Esenkent
21G — Kadıköy - Gülensu Mahallesi
21K — Kadıköy - Kurfalı
21U — Kadıköy - Uğur Mumcu
130 — Kadıköy-Tuzla
130A — Kadıköy-Deniz Harp Okulu
130Ş — Kadıköy-Şifa Mahallesi
319 — Kadıköy - Kayışdağı
320A — Üsküdar - Sultanbeyli Mimarsinan/Samandıra
E-10 — Kadıköy - S. Gökçen Havalimanı/Kurtköy 
E-11 — Kadıköy - S. Gökçen Havalimanı

References

Railway stations opened in 2016
Istanbul metro stations
Transport in Kadıköy
2016 establishments in Turkey